The Gerald Loeb Award is given annually for multiple categories of business reporting. The "Broadcast Enterprise" category was awarded in 2012 for a radio story that aired on National Public Radio, and the "Broadcast" category was awarded in 2013 for a television news story that aired on WFAA-TV. "Broadcast" was replaced by "Video/Audio" in 2014.

Gerald Loeb Award for Broadcast Enterprise (2012)

 "When Patents Attack" by Laura Sydell and Alex Blumberg, NPR

Story:
"When Patents Attack", July 22, 2011

Gerald Loeb Award for Broadcast (2013)

 "Denticaid: Medicaid Dental Abuse in Texas" by Byron Harris, Billy Bryant, Jason Trahan and Mark Smith, WFAA-TV

See also
 Gerald Loeb Award winners for Radio
 Gerald Loeb Award winners for Television

References

External links
 Gerald Loeb Award historical winners list

 
American journalism awards
Gerald Loeb Award winners